The University of Fujairah (UOF) is a higher education institution in Fujairah City, capital city of Fujairah, United Arab Emirates. It was originally founded as Fujairah College in 2006.

The foundation of the college was initiated by the members of the Fujairah Welfare Association (FWA).

UOF is located on Hamad Bin Abdulla Road in central Fujairah City.

References

External links
 University of Fujairah website

2006 establishments in the United Arab Emirates
Educational institutions established in 2006
Universities and colleges in the Emirate of Fujairah
Fujairah City